is a natural satellite of Jupiter. It was discovered by a team of astronomers from the University of Hawaii led by Scott S. Sheppard et al. in 2004 from pictures taken in 2003.

 is about 2 kilometres in diameter, and orbits Jupiter at an average distance of 24,700 Mm in about 792 days, at an inclination of 146° to the ecliptic, in a retrograde direction and with an eccentricity of 0.321.

It belongs to the Pasiphae group, irregular retrograde moons orbiting Jupiter at distances ranging between 22.8 and 24.1 Gm, and with inclinations ranging between 144.5° and 158.3°.

This moon was considered lost until late 2020, when it was recovered by Sheppard and independently by amateur astronomer Kai Ly. The recovery of the moon was announced by the Minor Planet Center on 13 January 2021, while additional recovery observations by Sheppard were later published on 27 January 2021.

References 

Pasiphae group
Moons of Jupiter
Irregular satellites
Astronomical objects discovered in 2004
Moons with a retrograde orbit